Ahuachapán is a city, and municipality, and the capital of the Ahuachapán Department in western El Salvador. The municipality, including the city, covers an area of 244.84 km² and as of 2007 has a population of 110,511 people. Situated near the Guatemalan border, it is the westernmost city in the country and is the center of an agricultural region producing primarily coffee.

Ahuachapán is the site of a geothermal power plant and a hydroelectric station. The local geothermal activity produces many steam vents, visible throughout the surrounding mountains.

Among other things, Ahuachapan is also the birthplace of notable Salvadoran poet Alfredo Espino and is about an hour's drive from the national wildlife park El Imposible.

History
Ahuachapán was founded by Mayan Indians of the Poqomam tribe in the 5th century, and was invaded in the 15th century by the Izalcos people. It officially gained city status in El Salvador on 11 February 1862 and became the departmental capital on 9 February 1899.

Geography
The municipality of Ahuachapán is located 100 km from the capital city San Salvador. To the north it borders San Lorenzo and the Republic of Guatemala. It is surrounded by San Lorenzo, Atiquizaya and Turín; by Juayúa, Apaneca, and Tacuba to the south. The climate of the municipality is very warm with the temperatures oscillating between 22 °C and 27 °C.

The principal river is the Río Paz. There are other tributaries but the Río Paz forms a natural border between El Salvador and Guatemala.

Local attractions

Monuments/main attractions
Near the Iglesia La Asunción, the Francisco Menéndez Park has a monument to honor General Francisco Menéndez who was president of the republic. There is a bronze plate indicating the house where he lived. One of the main attractions is the Central Plaza, which contains: the Central Park, known as Parque Concordia, surrounded by City Hall (a modern style building with a little resemblance of art deco, rebuilt after a fire in the 1950s), the town's main church, Iglesia de La Asunción, which is over 100 years old, and the Pasaje Concordia, also known as "the new place in town," that was restored in the early twenty first century and is a pedestrian-only street.

Lagoon of El Espino
It was formerly called Huitziapan or "Laguna de la Espina"  and is four kilometers to the north-west of the city of Ahuachapan, along the international highway to Guatemala. Between this body of water and the city of Ahuachapán, the first battle in the history of independent Central America took place; the battle of Espino, on 12 March 1822. .

Other attractions include Los Ausoles (an area of geysers, small and large steam vents and bubbling hot fountains), the Lagoon Morán, Atehuecillas and Malacatiupán. Close to Las Chinamas is "Los Encuentros" where the "Rio Paz" river and the "El Pulula" river (Guatemalan river) merge. "La Poza de la Yerba Buena" of the Pueblo Viejo river in the Cantón Santa Cruz is nearby. El Arco Durán, situated in the perimeter of the city of Ahuachapán, is a replica of a famous French arch, with all kinds of delicious and typical Salvadorean "Pupusas" nearby.

Administrative divisions

Cantons
The municipality is divided into 29 cantons (regions/districts).

These are: Ashapuco, Chancuyo, Chipilapa, Cuyanausul, El Anonal, Cantón Platanares, El Roble, El Tigre, El Barro, Guayaltepec, La Coyotera, La Danta, La Montañita, Las Chinamas (Puesto Fronterizo), Llano de Doña María, Llano de La Laguna o El Espino, Loma de La Gloria, Los Huatales, Los Magueyes, Los Toles, Nejapa, Palo Pique, Río Frío, San Lázaro, San Ramón, Santa Cruz, Santa Rosa Acacalco, Suntecumat y Tacubita.

Towns and villages in the municipality

Agua Shuca
Ahuachapán
Ashapuco
Ataco
Calapa
Chancuyo
Chipilapa
Cuyanausul
El Anonal
El Barro
El Espino
El Jobo 
El Junquillo
El Mojón
El Roble
El Saitillal
El Tigre 
Guayaltepec
Hacienda San Isidro
Hacienda San Luis
La Angostura
La Coyotera
La Danta
La Guascota
La Montañita
Las Chinamas
Las Delicias
Llano de Doña Maria
Llano de La Laguna
Loma de La Gloria
Los Horcones
Los Huatales
Los Magueyes
Los Toles
Palo Pique
Río Frío
San José
San Lázaro
San Luis
San Ramón
San Raymundo
San Venancio
Santa Cruz
Santa Rita
Santa Rosa Acacalco
Suntecumat
Tacuba

Climate

Economy

The most important industries are geothermal energy, coffee, textiles and construction materials.

Traditions

The most important tradition is the Día de los Farolitos (Day of the Little Lantern Lights), held every year on 7 September, where a parade and celebration is conducted to honor the birth of the Virgin Mary.

Notable people
Alfredo Espino
Ricardo Trigueros Deleón
Humberto Escapini
Roberto Galicia
Miguel Ángel Espino
Santiago José Celis
Mauricio Linares Aguilar
Francisco Menéndez
Alvaro Magaña Borja
Timoteo Menéndez
Mario Benjamín Castro

Sports
The Once Municipal (Municipal Eleven) is the local professional association football club of the Department of Ahuachapán.  The home stadium of Once Municipal is Estadio Simeón Magaña.

See also
Concepción de Ataco
Apaneca
Sonsonate
San Salvador

References

Municipalities of the Ahuachapán Department